Oakridge Public Schools is a public school district in Egelston Township, Michigan, which is located inside of Muskegon, Michigan.

The school mascot is the Eagle. The school colors are blue and white. Oakridge is known in West Michigan for its success in football, especially under head coach Jack Schugars. The Eagles claimed state championships in football in 1997, 2005, and 2008. They also finished runner-up in 1990 and 2003.

Schools
 Oakridge High School (grades 9 to 12)
 Oakridge Middle School (grades 7 to 8)
 Oakridge Upper Elementary (grades 4 to 6)
 Oakridge Lower Elementary (grades K to 3)
 Oakridge Early Childhood Center (grades pre-K, formally known as Carr School)

External links
 Oakridge Public Schools Official website

School districts in Michigan
Education in Muskegon County, Michigan